André Álvares de Almada (fl. 16th and 17th centuries) was a Cape Verdean writer, trader and explorer of mestiço (mixed) descent.  He was one of the first recorded Cape Verdean writers in Cape Verdean history, in 1598, he was knighted as a Knight of the Order of Christ.

Biography 
At the end of the 16th century, captain André Álvares de Almada is thought to had a mother of mixed descent, he was the son of captain Ciprião Álvares de Almada "noble of one of the main islands".

In 1578, he met with the Mali gold traders along the Gambia River.

He written several historical annals of the Portuguese expansion, after exploring the interior of Guinea (the area today that is largely known as Guinea-Bissau), The Short Treatise of the Rivers of Guinea of Cape Verde between the Senegal River and Baixos de Santa Ana and All the Black Nations on the Coast and its Clothing, Arms, Weapons and Wars in 1594.  It was later edited in 1733 and later edited by Diogo Kopke in 1841.  The work was about the important for the studies of the entire area between the Senegal River and Sierra Leone.

Short treatise of the Rivers of Guinea of Cape Verde
The treatise was a classic for the knowledge of history of the regions of African peoples in West Africa.  The Treaty between the Rivers of Guinea of Cape Verde between the Senegal River and Baixos de Santa Ana and All the Black Nations on the Coast and its Clothing, Arms, Weapons and Wars.

The text is a historic source characterizes with a narrative.  This provides a rich material for consideration.

References

External links
ALMADA, André Álvares de, ca 1555-1650, Tratado breue dos Reinos de guine do cabo verde ff.to pollo capitao Andre Alluares dallmada natural da cidade e ilha do Cabo Verde cursado e pratigo nas ditas partes, Regimento da Santa Inquisição, Manuscrito, Portuguese National Library, digital copy: cod-297 
André d’Almada: um certo olhar "renascentista", by Raul Mendes Fernandes, September 2006 
Notice sur André Alvarez d'Almada et sa description de la Guinée (Notices by Andrew Álvares de Almada) (1842), A. Bertrand, 1842, Digitizing sponsor: Google, Book from the collections of: University of Michigan

Portuguese writers
Cape Verdean male writers
Portuguese explorers
People from Santiago, Cape Verde